Morelia spilota cheynei, or the jungle carpet python, is a python subspecies found in the rainforests of Queensland, Australia.

Etymology
The specific name, cheynei, is in honor of Cheyne Wellington.

Geographic range
The type locality given is "Ravenshoe, on the Atherton Tableland, north Queensland, in Lat. 17° 36' S, Long 145° 29' E" (Australia).

Size
Adults of these medium-sized pythons typically measure 5–7 ft (1.5–2.1 m) in total length. As with most species of snakes, females are typically larger than males. This is not, however, always the case.

Diet
Like all snakes these semiarboreal snakes are strictly carnivorous. They feed on medium-sized rodents such as rats, mice, and baby rabbits in captivity.

References

Further reading
  ("Morelia cheynei sp. nov.", pp. 106–107.)

External links

 

Morelia (snake)
Snakes of Australia